124 (one hundred [and] twenty-four) is the natural number following 123 and preceding 125.

In mathematics

124 is an untouchable number, meaning that it is not the sum of proper divisors of any positive number.

It is a stella octangula number, the number of spheres packed in the shape of a stellated octahedron. It is also an icosahedral number.

There are 124 different polygons of length 12 formed by edges of the integer lattice, counting two polygons as the same only when one is a translated copy of the other.

124 is a perfectly partitioned number, meaning that it divides the number of partitions of 124. It is the first number to do so after 1, 2, and 3.

See also
 The year AD 124 or 124 BC
 124th (disambiguation)
 List of highways numbered 124

References 

Integers